Qatar does not have any permanent rivers, but instead has numerous wadis. Wadis are defined as dry river valleys which experience intermittent water flow during the rainy season.

The Ministry of Municipality and Environment has recorded a total of 306 wadis scattered throughout Qatar.

Some of the most prominent wadis are:
Wadi Asmah
Wadi Al Banat
Wadi Debayan
Wadi Diyab
Wadi Ghirban
Wadi Huwaila
Wadi Lusail

References

Qatar
Valleys